Dudley Danvers Granville Coutts Ryder, 7th Earl of Harrowby, TD (20 December 1922 – 9 October 2007) was a deputy chairman of Coutts bank and its parent company, NatWest.  He was a descendant of Thomas Coutts, who joined the bank in 1761, and of Sir Dudley Ryder, Lord Chief Justice of the King's Bench in the 1750s.  He was known by his courtesy title of Viscount Sandon from 1956 to 1987, when he succeeded to the title of Earl of Harrowby upon the death of his father, the 6th Earl.

When he was born, his father, also Dudley Ryder, was member of parliament for Shrewsbury and Parliamentary Private Secretary to the Sir Samuel Hoare.  His mother, Lady Helena Blanche Coventry, was the daughter of George William Coventry, Viscount Deerhurst, first son of George Coventry, 9th Earl of Coventry.

He was educated at Eton.  He joined the young soldiers' battalion of the South Staffordshire Regiment in 1940, while at Eton.  He was commissioned in 1942.  He landed in Normandy 6 days after D-Day, and served in Northern Europe in the Second World War in the 59th (Staffordshire) Infantry Division.  He moved to the 133 Field Regiment Royal Artillery in February 1945, part of the 53rd (Welsh) Infantry Division, but was severely injured near the Reichswald forest only a few days later.  After recovering from his injuries, he was posted to the Far East in preparation for the invasion of Malaya, Operation Zipper.  The operation was abandoned following the surrender of Japan.  He remained in the Far East after the war, serving as a political officer with the 5th Battalion of the Parachute Regiment in Java, under Laurens van der Post.  He continued as an officer in the Territorial Army after he retired from the regular Army, rising to rank of lieutenant-colonel before retiring in 1964, having commanded the 254 (City of London) Field Regiment Royal Artillery.

Although he did not follow many of his ancestors in standing for Parliament, he was a councillor in the Royal Borough of Kensington and Chelsea from 1950 to 1971.  He was president of the Wolverhampton South West Conservative Association, resigning in protest after the sitting MP, Enoch Powell, made his "rivers of blood" speech in 1968.

He turned down a place at New College, Oxford to join the family bank after leaving the Army, and became a managing director in 1949.  He continued in that role until 1989, and was also deputy chairman from 1970 to 1989.  He was responsible for the modernisation of the bank during the 1970s and 1980s, introducing computerisation and co-ordinating a redevelopment of the bank's offices on the Strand to a design by Sir Frederick Gibberd.  When Coutts' parent company, National Provincial Bank, merged with Westminster Bank in 1968, he joined the board of the combined NatWest Bank.  He was deputy chairman of NatWest from 1971 to 1987.

He was also a director of the National Provident Institution until 1986, and of the Saudi International Bank, Bentley Engineering, Powell Duffryn, Dowty and Dinorwic Slate Quarries.  He also held public appointments, including being chairman of the governors of the combined Bethlem Royal and Maudsley hospitals, a governor of the University of Keele, and treasurer of the Family Welfare Association.  He was also a member of the member Trilateral Commission and of the Institut International d'Études Bancaires.

He took the courtesy title of Viscount Sandon following the death of his grandfather in 1956, and succeeded his father as 7th Earl of Harrowby in 1987.  He also inherited the family seat, neo-Jacobean Sandon Hall near Stafford, designed by William Burn in 1850.  Together with all but 90 hereditary peers, he lost his seat in the House of Lords after the passing of the House of Lords Act 1999 implemented reforms proposed by the Labour Government.

He married Jeannette Rosalthé Johnston-Saint, younger daughter of Captain Peter Johnston-Saint, on 14 June 1949.  They had a son and a daughter. His first wife died in 1997, and he remarried in 2003, to Janet Boote (née Stott), youngest daughter of Alan Edward Stott.

He died suddenly at Sandon Hall, of a suspected heart attack. He was survived by his second wife, and the two children from his first marriage. His son, Dudley Ryder, succeeded him as 8th Earl.

References

Obituary in The Times, 29 October 2007
Obituary, The Daily Telegraph, 16 October 2007
Obituary The Guardian, 26 November 2007

External links

1922 births
2007 deaths
British Army personnel of World War II
British Parachute Regiment officers
Councillors in Greater London
Councillors in the Royal Borough of Kensington and Chelsea
Earls of Harrowby
English bankers
People educated at Eton College
Royal Artillery officers
South Staffordshire Regiment officers
Dudley
20th-century English businesspeople
Harrowby